Alstroemeria aurea is a species of flowering plant in the family Alstroemeriaceae, native to Chile and Argentina, but naturalised in Australia, New Zealand and the United Kingdom. It is also widely cultivated as an ornamental.

Common names include yellow alstroemeria, though cultivars have been selected in a range of colours. The name Peruvian lily is often applied to this and other species of Alstroemeria, despite the fact that most are not native to that country.

Many orchid-like flowers in brilliant shades of yellow and orange. appear in early to midsummer. The flowers may be heavily spotted or striped with red or brown. If undisturbed, plants will spread rapidly in benign conditions.

It requires a sheltered spot in sun or part shade.

The Latin specific epithet aureum means "golden".

References

Flora of Chile
Flora of Argentina
aurea